Toku (stylized in all capital letters) is an American pay television network and streaming service owned by Olympusat and dedicated to broadcasting anime and East Asian programming.

Launched on December 31, 2015, replacing Funimation Channel, after Funimation ended their partnership with Olympusat. Tristan Leostar is the content aggregator for the network.

History

As Funimation Channel

Funimation Channel started out as a syndicated block on Colours TV, one of OlympuSAT's affiliate networks. Programs during this era were Dragon Ball, Negima!, Kodocha, The Slayers, Blue Gender, Kiddy Grade, Fruits Basket, Case Closed and YuYu Hakusho. The block was later discontinued in favor of a more successful expansion on subscription television.

On May 1, 2008, Funimation Channel became a 24-hour English-dubbed anime subscription network; the second of its kind in North America (following A.D. Vision's Anime Network). Olympusat was chosen as the exclusive distributor of Funimation Channel. The service originally was available to a few cities via digital terrestrial television and was temporary-only as the channel was trying to gain a foothold in the already-crowded pay television landscape.

In May 2009, Funimation Channel continued its expansion on subscription providers launching on Comcast's VOD platform  and offering two services - Free on demand and PPV on demand. The PPV VOD offers viewers a chance to watch titles prior to their DVD release.

As of September 27, 2010, Funimation launched an HD feed alongside existing VOD services. On February 16, 2012, Verizon announced that it will drop Funimation Channel from its Verizon FiOS service "on, or after March 15" due to "very low viewership". In response to reaction from its customers, Verizon returned Funimation Channel via VOD.  Channel 262 remains on the FiOS system operated by Frontier Communications in some ex-Verizon territories. Cablevision's Optimum TV recently launched FUNimation Channel On Demand in the NY/NJ/CT Tri-State area. Adding this MSO increased FUNimation Channel's footprint to over 40 million households nationwide.

Funimation Channel's programming came from Funimation, Aniplex of America, Viz Media, Sentai Filmworks, Right Stuf Inc., NIS America, Discotek Media, and the now-defunct Central Park Media and Enoki Films USA.

As Toku
On December 8, 2015, it was reported that the channel would change its name to Toku on December 31, 2015, and would start broadcasting live-action, grindhouse and independent East Asian movies. It was subsequently announced, on December 15, 2015, that Funimation would end its partnership with Olympusat, and announced plans to relaunch Funimation Channel in 2016.

On March 14, 2016, Olympusat announced a localized version of Toku in Latin America, named Toku Español. However, as of 2022, the channel is yet to be launched in the region.

On July 25, 2016, it was announced that Toku was going to be launched in the FlixFling streaming service by early 2017, but to date, that never happened. On June 8, 2017, it was announced that Toku is available on Amazon Channels as a streaming service for members of Amazon Prime, offering channel content on demand for US$4.00 per month, after a 7-day free trial.

On August 23, 2017, Consolidated Communications added Toku on its channel line-up.

On May 22, 2018, Toku launches a beta version of its new streaming service WatchTOKU.com for the United States and Canada, which includes channel content and future releases, as well as embedded forums. The service, powered by Vimeo, costs either US$4.00 per month or US$40.00 per year. This is Toku's official debut outside the United States, being available for the first time in Canada.

Toku's programming comes from Media Blasters, Tsuburaya Productions, MonoFilm Sales and other anime and movie licensors.

Availability

The linear channel is available on AT&T U-verse, Claro Puerto Rico, Hotwire Communications, Consolidated Communications, Sjobergs Inc., IFiber Communications and OptiLink; its HD feed has been available since the network's launch in 2015. The linear channel was previously available on Verizon FiOS.

The VOD service is available on Optimum, Xfinity, Vubiquity, Frontier FiOS and Armstrong. The VOD service was previously available on Charter Communications and Massilion.

The channel is available in streaming through its WatchToku.com streaming service, as well as its Amazon Prime channel. It was formerly available on Go90.

Programming

Anime series

Current

 Girl's High 
 Gakuen Heaven: Boy's Love Hyper 
 Green Green 
 Jubei Chan: Secret of the Lovely Eyepatch 
 Juden Chan 
 Ladies versus Butlers! 
 Night Head Genesis 
 Princess Princess 
 Ramen Fighter Miki 
 Rio: Rainbow Gate! 
 Strawberry Panic! 
 Super Robot Wars Original Generation: Divine Wars 
 Yosuga no Sora 
 Saber Rider and the Star Sheriffs 
 Yamibou 
 After School Midnighters (short series) 
 Darkness Boy Santa 
 Kowabon
 Cheer or Sneer, Mr. Deer? 
 World War Blue 
 Queen's Blade: Wandering Warrior 
 The Ultraman

Upcoming
 Ikki Tousen: Dragon Destiny
 Genshiken
 Dojin Work
 Kujibiki Heart

Former

 .hack//Quantum
 A Certain Magical Index
 A Certain Scientific Railgun
 Aesthetica of a Rogue Hero
 Appleseed XIII
 Aquarion
 Aquarion Evol
 Aria the Scarlet Ammo
 B Gata H Kei
 Baccano!
 Baka and Test
 Baki the Grappler
 Bamboo Blade
 Basilisk
 BECK: Mongolian Chop Squad
 Ben-To
 Big Windup!
 Black Blood Brothers
 Black Butler
 Black Cat
 Black Lagoon
 Blassreiter
 Blood-C
 Blue Gender
 Boogiepop Phantom
 Burst Angel
 Buso Renkin
 C
 Case Closed
 Casshern Sins
 Cat Planet Cuties
 Chaos;Head
 Chobits
 Chrome Shelled Regios
 Claymore
 Code: Breaker
 Corpse Princess
 D.Gray-man
 D-Frag!
 Danganronpa
 Darker Than Black
 Deadman Wonderland
 Devil May Cry
 Dragon Age
 Dragon Ball
 Dragonaut: The Resonance
 Eden of the East
 El Cazador de la Bruja
 Ergo Proxy
 Eureka Seven
 Eureka Seven: AO
 Fafner in the Azure
 Fairy Tail
 Fractale
 Freezing
 Fruits Basket
 Full Metal Panic!
 Full Metal Panic? Fumoffu
 Future Diary
 Ga-Rei-Zero
 Galaxy Railways
 Gankutsuou: The Count of Monte Cristo
 Good Luck Girl!
 Gungrave
 Gunslinger Girl
 Haganai
 Haré+Guu
 Heaven's Lost Property
 Hero Tales
 Heroic Age
 Hetalia
 High School DxD
 His and Her Circumstances
 Honey and Clover
 Hunter × Hunter (1999)
 Hyperdimension Neptunia
 Ikki Tousen
 Is This a Zombie?
 Jormungand
 Jyu-Oh-Sei
 Kamisama Kiss
 Karneval
 Kaze no Stigma
 Kenichi: The Mightiest Disciple
 Kiddy Grade
 Kodocha
 Lucky Star
 Last Exile
 Last Exile: Fam, the Silver Wing
 Level E
 Linebarrels of Iron
 Maken-ki!
 Michiko and Hatchin
 Monster
 MoonPhase
 Mushishi
 My Bride Is a Mermaid
 Nabari no Ou
 Nana
 Negima! Magister Negi Magi
 Ninja Nonsense
 Oh! Edo Rocket
 Ōkami-san to Shichinin no Nakamatachi
 Ouran High School Host Club
 Pandalian
 Peach Girl
 Phantom: Requiem for the Phantom
 Ping Pong
 Princess Jellyfish
 Revolutionary Girl Utena
 RideBack
 Robotics;Notes
 Samurai 7
 Samurai Champloo
 Sankarea
 Sasami: Magical Girls Club
 School Rumble
 Sekirei
 Sengoku Basara: Samurai Kings
 Serial Experiments Lain
 Shakugan no Shana
 Shangri-La
 Shigurui: Death Frenzy
 Shiki
 Shingu: Secret of the Stellar Wars
 Slayers
 Slayers Evolution-R
 Slayers Next
 Slayers Revolution
 Slayers Try
 Solty Rei
 Soul Eater
 Spice and Wolf
 Spiral: The Bonds of Reasoning
 Suzuka
 Tenchi Muyo! GXP
 Tenchi Muyo! War on Geminar
 Tetsuwan Birdy: Decode
 The Guyver: Bio-Booster Armor
 The Legend of the Legendary Heroes
 The Sacred Blacksmith
 To
 Trinity Blood
 Tsubasa: Reservoir Chronicle
 Witchblade
 xxxHolic
 Yu Yu Hakusho

Live-action drama series

 Shinobi Girl
 TOKU Talk
 Ultraman Max 
 Ultraman 80 
 Ultraman Neos
 Ultraman Nexus
 Ultraseven X 
 Flesh for the Beast: Tsukiko's Curse 
 The Shaolin Warriors 
 Neo Ultra Q 
 Project X 
 Ultra Galaxy Mega Monster Battle 
 Ultraman Zero: The Chronicle 
 Guardian 
 Ultra Galaxy Mega Monster Battle: Never Ending Odyssey 
 Angels 
 The Legendary Outlaw 
 Ultraman Leo 
 Hot Girl 
 Gridman the Hyper Agent 
 Ultraman Ginga 
 Ultraman Gaia 
 Ultraman Ginga S 
 Samurai Cat 
 Ultraman Mebius 
 Amazing Detective Di Renjie 2 
 Ultraman Cosmos 
 The Complex 
 Ghost Theater 
 Ultraman X 
 The Chronicle Of A Tai-Chi Master 
 Ultraman Orb 
 Mirrorman 
 Kamen Rider Agito

Upcoming
 Amazing Detective Di Renjie 3
 Young Sherlock

Anime films

 After School Midnighters
 Mazinkaiser SKL
 Kite
 Kite Liberator

 
 Bayonetta: Bloody Fate
 Blood-C: The Last Dark
 Eden of the East: Paradise Lost
 Eden of the East: The King of Eden
 Evangelion: 1.0 You Are (Not) Alone
 Evangelion: 2.0 You Can (Not) Advance
 Fafner in the Azure: Heaven and Earth
 Fairy Tail the Movie: Phoenix Priestess
 Fullmetal Alchemist: The Sacred Star of Milos
 Grave of the Fireflies
 King of Thorn
 Mass Effect: Paragon Lost
 Oblivion Island: Haruka and the Magic Mirror
 Origin: Spirits of the Past
 Revolutionary Girl Utena: The Movie
 Sengoku Basara: The Last Party
 Shakugan no Shana: The Movie
 Summer Wars
 Tales of Vesperia
 Tenchi the Movie: Tenchi Muyo in Love
 Tenchi the Movie 2: The Daughter of Darkness
 Trigun: Badlands Rumble
 Urusei Yatsura: Beautiful Dreamer
 Vexille

Live-action films

 Arcana (2013 film)
 Bang Rajan 2
 Battle of Demons
 Battle of Demons 2
 Battle of Demons 3
 Black Rat
 Creepy Hide & Seek
 Death Bell 2: Bloody Camp
 Death Blog
 Death on Live Streaming
 Death Kappa
 Death Trance
 Deep in the Jungle
 Eko Eko Azarak: The First Episode of Misa Kuroi
 Female Convict Scorpion (2008 film)
 Friday Killer
 Gallants
 Ghost Day
 Ghost Mother
 Meat Grinder
 Grotesque
 Hansel & Gretel (2007 film)
 Hanuman: The Monkey Warrior
 Hair Extensions
 Heaven and Hell
 Henge
 Horror Mansion: The Blind
 Karate Girl
 Kunoichi Hunters
 Kwaidan
 Nightfall
 Oh My Ghost
 Oh My Ghost 2
 Oh My Ghost 3
 Outerman
 Pahuyut Fighting Beat
 Perng Mang: The Haunted Drum
 Lady Ninja: Reflections of Darkness
 Legendary Amazons
 Little Big Soldier
 Ring of Curse
 Riki-Oh: The Story of Ricky
 Saturday Killer
 Stool Piegon
 Shinobi Girl: The Movie
 Siyama: Village of Warriors
 Spicy Robbery
 Sukima Onna
 Still
 Suzune Evolution
 Tajomaru
 Tomio
 The Assassins
 The Eight Inmortals in School II
 The Machine Girl
 The King of Fighters
 The Intruder
 Ichi The Killer
 The Legend of Sudsakorn
 The Possession in Japan
 The Rascals
 The Sisters
 The Tiger Blade
 Tokyo Gore Police
 Tokyo Gore School
 Train of the Dead
 Unborn Child
 Ultraman Mebius Side Story: Armored Darkness
 Ultraman Mebius Side Story: Ghost Reverse
 Ultraman Mebius Side Story: Hikari Saga
 War of the Arrows
 Wu Dang
 Yakuza Weapon
 Yakuza: Like a Dragon
 Young Gun In The Time
 Zomvideo
 Zombodian

 
 009-1: The End of the Beginning
 Alien vs Ninja
 Goemon
 Higanjima: Escape from Vampire Island
 Ichi
 Kamui Gaiden
 Robogeisha
 Street Fighter: Assassin's Fist
 The Legend Is Born – Ip Man
 The Treasure Hunter
 Vampire Girl vs. Frankenstein Girl

OVAs

 Ai no Kusabi
 Holy Knight
 Shamanic Princess
 Super Robot Wars Original Generation: The Animation

 Black Lagoon OVA: Roberta's Blood Trail
 Baka and Test: Summon the Beasts OVA: Matsuri
 Gunslinger Girl -II Teatrino- OVA
 Hellsing Ultimate
 Project A-ko
 Project A-ko: Cinderella Rhapsody
 Project A-ko: Final
 Project A-ko: Plot of the Daitokuji
 Project A-ko: Vs. Series
 Record of Lodoss War
 Roujin Z
 School Rumble OVA: Extra Class
 Shakugan no Shana OVA: S
 Shakugan no Shana OVA: SP
 Tsubasa Spring Thunder Chronicles
 Tsubasa: Tokyo Revelations

References

External links
Official website

Television networks in the United States
Anime television
Television channels and stations established in 2015
2015 establishments in Florida